John Taylor is a double name combining John and Taylor. Notable people with the name include:

John Taylor Arms (1887-1953), American artist
John Taylor Caldwell (1911–2007), Scottish anarchist communist 
John Taylor Coleridge (1790–1876), English judge
John Taylor Dismukes, American artist
John Taylor Douglas (1892–1976), Canadian politician and farmer 
John Taylor Fotheringham (1860–1940), Surgeon General of Canada
John Taylor Gatto (born 1935), American teacher & activist
John Taylor Gilman (1753-1828), American politician - New Hampshire
John Taylor Gilmour (1855–1918), Canadian physician, journalist and politician
John Taylor Hamilton (1843–1925), American politician
John Taylor Johnston (1820–1893), American businessman and patron of the arts.
John Taylor Jones (1802–1851), American missionary
John Taylor Lewis (1894–1983), U.S. Army lieutenant general
John Taylor Smith (1860–1938), English bishop and military chaplain
John Taylor Wood (1830–1904),  U.S. Navy and Confederate Navy officer
Jonathan Taylor Thomas (born 1981), American actor